Wim Raymaekers (born 4 April 1985) is a Belgian football player who last played as a professional for Delhi Dynamos. In 2016, he announced signing for amateur team KVV Zonhoven, playing in the Belgian Provincial leagues.

Career
The defender began his career in the youth ranks of Genk. Raymaekers left Genk in 2005 to play with Dutch second division side Den Bosch, where he played several matches in the first team for two seasons, before moving back to Belgium and signing with second division team KVSK United. After two seasons he transferred to RS Waasland from the same division in 2009. Finally OH Leuven signed Raymaekers from Waasland in 2010. Raymaekers was one of the players guiding OH Leuven to the first division in the 2010-11 season and was part of the team also for the three seasons until they relegated again. In 2014, he joined Delhi Dynamos. On 25 October 2014 he scored his first goal for the club within 57 seconds off kick-off, a left-footed drive from the edge of the box to open the scoring, against Chennaiyin FC at the Jawaharlal Nehru Stadium, New Delhi.

References

External links
 

1985 births
Living people
Belgian footballers
Oud-Heverlee Leuven players
Belgian Pro League players
Challenger Pro League players
Eerste Divisie players
Belgian expatriate footballers
Expatriate footballers in the Netherlands
Belgian expatriate sportspeople in the Netherlands
K.R.C. Genk players
FC Den Bosch players
S.K. Beveren players
Lommel S.K. players
Expatriate footballers in India
Belgian expatriate sportspeople in India
Odisha FC players
Sportspeople from Hasselt
Footballers from Limburg (Belgium)
Association football defenders